Michael Thurmeier is a Canadian animator and film director. He is best known for directing the films Ice Age: Continental Drift and Ice Age: Collision Course.

Life
Thurmeier was born and raised in Regina, Saskatchewan, Canada, and went to Archbishop M.C. O'Neill High School. Although he enjoyed drawing for much of his early life, he was more interested in becoming a lawyer, but he changed his mind after seeing Aladdin in his last year of high school.

Career
After he joined Blue Sky Studios, he served as an animator for Fight Club and The Sopranos. He later served as a supervising animator for Ice Age, Robots, and Ice Age: The Meltdown.

His first directing job was in 2006, when he co-directed the short animated film No Time for Nuts, starring Scrat for which he was nominated for an Academy Award for Best Animated Short Film. He was a co-director on Ice Age: Dawn of the Dinosaurs (2009), and made his feature directing debut with Ice Age: Continental Drift (2012). Thurmeier returned to direct Ice Age: Collision Course (2016).

Filmography

Feature films

Short films

Television

References

External links
 

1975 births
Artists from Regina, Saskatchewan
Blue Sky Studios people
Canadian animated film directors
Film directors from Saskatchewan
Living people